Jaume Bosch may refer to:
 Jacques Bosch or Jaume Bosch (1826–1895), Spanish guitarist in Paris
 Jaume Bosch i Puges, mayor of Sant Boi de Llobregat, Socialists' Party of Catalonia, PSC
 Miguel Jaume y Bosch (1844–1900), Spanish painter who lived most of his life in Montevideo, Uruguay